Bert Monroe Knibbs (March 3, 1924 – July 31, 1998), was a Canadian ice hockey player with the Lethbridge Maple Leafs. He won a gold medal at the 1951 World Ice Hockey Championships in Paris, France. The 1951 Lethbridge Maple Leafs team was inducted to the Alberta Sports Hall of Fame in 1974.

References

1924 births
1998 deaths
Canadian ice hockey right wingers
Ice hockey people from Alberta